Lake Martin is located in Tallapoosa, Elmore and Coosa counties in Alabama. It is a 39,000-acre (178 km²) reservoir with over 750 miles (1,200 km) of wooded shoreline. Lake Martin is a reservoir, enlarged by the construction of Martin Dam on the Tallapoosa River.The Martin Dam powerhouse is used to generate hydroelectric power for the Alabama Power Company. Construction on Martin Dam began in 1923 and was completed in 1926, creating what was, at that time, the largest man-made body of water in the world. Originally known as Cherokee Bluffs for the geological formation upon which it was built, the dam was renamed in 1936 in honor of Thomas Martin, the then-president of Alabama Power Company. Alabama Power and Russell Lands own some of the shoreline.

Tourism

The third largest lake in Alabama, Lake Martin is a popular recreation area for swimming, boating, water skiing, camping and golfing. Many waterfront neighborhoods and luxury homes are located on Lake Martin. The cities of Alexander City, Dadeville, Jacksons Gap, and Eclectic are nearby.

Lake Martin hosts many events throughout the year, including fishing tournaments, a 4th of July fireworks event, the Alexander City Jazz Festival (an annual event every June in downtown Alexander City) and entertainment at the Route 63 Lake Martin Amphitheater. 

Lake Martin includes many popular attractions, including eagle nests, sand beaches, restaurants, camping areas and popular islands such as Goat Island. The lake has several landmarks, such as the Smith Mountain Fire Tower, Kowaliga Bridge, and several marinas, but perhaps the most recognized landmark on the lake is Chimney Rock, a large rock formation that resembles a chimney. Although Chimney Rock is located several hundred yards away, this formation most people call Chimney Rock is actually Acapulco Rock. The spot is visited by thousands of boaters yearly, who park in front of "The Rock" to watch people climb up  and jump off into the water. In July 2006, a teenager died after his jump from the rock.

Lake Martin has become a weekend getaway for many families from around the South.  Many exclusive multi-million dollar residences are located on the lake; among them is the former property of Richard M. Scrushy, the founder and former chairman of HealthSouth Corporation, located in the Willow Point area of Parker Creek. Built in 1998, together with a guest/boathouse, the residence contains over .. Many business CEO's from Montgomery, Birmingham and Atlanta have homes on the lake.

Alabama has a lake of a similar name, the Logan Martin Lake on the Coosa River.  Lake Martin and Logan Martin Lake are not part of the same river system.

Islands on Lake Martin
Small islands are popular spots on Lake Martin:
Cemetery Island - A small county graveyard from before the construction of Martin Dam is located on what is now a tiny island in Lake Martin. About 30 by  around, it is in the Bay Pine area.
Chimney Rock Island - Chimney Rock Island has long been a famous landmark on Lake Martin. Its name came from a tall rock resembling a chimney that protrudes from the top of the island.
Acapulco Rock Island - Acapulco Rock Island is adjacent to Chimney Rock Island at the Tallapoosa River Gorge. It is often mistaken for Chimney Rock.
Deer Island - A small island located less than half a mile northwest of Kowaliga Marina. At low water levels, it is connected to the mainland by a land bridge. Deer often cross to the island during the winter when the water levels are lowest and become trapped when the water level rises. Its shore has wide banks of fine grain sand and thus many residents dock boats on the islands.
Doctor's Island - So named because a group of doctors used the island as a fishing base camp.
Goat Island - Goat Island is north of Martin Dam. It has become the residence for a family of goats.
Real Island -  Not an island or distinct community, residents named it for "Real Island Road," which runs through it, and a nearby marina.
Sand Island - Sand Island is a small island located between Willow Point and Kowaliga Marina. Over the years erosion has taken its toll on the island, but rocks have recently been placed around the island to prevent it from being completed washed away. Boats frequently park on its sandy shallow beach. It is likely the smallest island on the lake.
Young's Island - The Young residence (of Young's ferry) was here and was destroyed by fire in the early 1990s.  The foundation remains and there are historic markers for the graves of the family's children.
Weed Hill Island - Weed Hill is a small island almost directly across from the Pleasure Point Marina boat ramp.  Although at one time it was much larger, erosion has reduced the landmass.
Wood's Island - Wood's Island is a larger island, connected to the mainland by a land bridge during low water times. It has several trails for hiking. It can be found at the end of Young's Ferry Rd on the West side of the lake.
Wilmarth's Island- only inhabited island on the lake.

Tornadoes
On April 27, 2011, an EF4 tornado ripped across Lake Martin. Several valuable houses and businesses were completely destroyed along its path. Some vehicles were carried over 100 yards. The tornado resulted in seven deaths across the region.

Another tornado went through the northern side of the lake on January 12, 2023. The tornado was rated EF3; however, the maximum damage near the lake was rated EF2.

See also
List of Alabama dams and reservoirs

References 
7. List of largest lakes of the United States by area. 
"Growing Up: Tales of Life on the Lake", by Bailey Jones
Schafer, Elizabeth D. Lake Martin: Alabama's Crown Jewel (2002). Charleston, SC: Arcadia

External links 
 Golakemartin.com
 Lake Martin Community and Visitors Guide
 5 Black American Towns Hidden Under Lakes And Ultimately From History Books

Protected areas of Tallapoosa County, Alabama
Protected areas of Elmore County, Alabama
Protected areas of Coosa County, Alabama
Landmarks in Alabama
Martin
Properties on the Alabama Register of Landmarks and Heritage
Dams in Alabama
Alabama Power dams
Dams completed in 1926
Bodies of water of Tallapoosa County, Alabama
Bodies of water of Elmore County, Alabama
Bodies of water of Coosa County, Alabama